A flood is an overflow or accumulation of an expanse of water that submerges land.

Flood(s), The Flood, Flooded or Flooding may also refer to:

Computing
 Flood fill, an algorithm that determines the area connected to a given node in a multi-dimensional array
 Flooding (computer networking)
 Internet Relay Chat flood, a form of denial-of-service attack
 MAC flooding, a technique employed to compromise the security of network switches
 Network flood, a denial-of-service attack on a network

Film and television
 The Flood (1927 film), a German silent film
 The Flood (1931 film), American film directed by James Tinling
 The Flood (1958 film), a Czech film
 The Flood (1962 film), an American television film narrated by Laurence Harvey
 The Flood (1963 film), children's adventure film written by Jean Scott Rogers
 Flood!, a 1976 American television film
 The Flood: Who Will Save Our Children? a 1993 American film based on real events.
 The Flood (1994 film), a French-Russian film
 Flood (2007 film), a 2007 disaster film
 Flood (2017 film), a 2017 Canadian animated short film by Amanda Strong
 The Flood (2010 film) or Mabul, an Israeli film
 The Flood (2019 film), a British drama film directed by Anthony Woodley
 "Flooded" (Buffy the Vampire Slayer), an episode of Buffy the Vampire Slayer
 "Flood" (The Young Ones), an episode of The Young Ones
 "The Flood" (Mad Men), an episode of Mad Men
 The Flood, a fictional viral Doctor Who villain

Literature
 The Flood (Al-Fayḍān), a 1975 short story collection by Haidar Haidar
 Flood (Baxter novel), a 2008 novel by Stephen Baxter
 Halo: The Flood, a 2003 novel by William C. Dietz 
 Flood (Doyle novel), a 2002 novel by Richard Doyle
 The Flood (novel), a 1986 novel by Ian Rankin
 The Flood (novella), an 1880 novella by Émile Zola
 The Flood, a 2004 novel by Maggie Gee
 Flood, a 2002 novel by James Heneghan
Floods, a 2000 volume of poetry by Maurice Riordan
 Flood, a 1985 novel in the Burke series by Andrew Vachss
 Flood: A Romance of Our Time, a 1964 novel by Robert Penn Warren

Music
 The Flood (band), an Australian band
Flood (producer) or Mark Ellis (born 1960), record producer

Albums
 Flood (Boris album) (2000)
 Flood (Jeremy Fisher album) (2010)
 The Flood (Gospel Gangstaz album) (2006)
 Flood (Headswim album) (1994)
 Flood (Herbie Hancock album) (1975)
 Flood (Kreidler album) (2019)
 The Flood (Of Mice & Men album) (2011)
 Flood (Keren Peles album) (2008)
 Flood (They Might Be Giants album) (1990)
 Flood (Stella Donnelly album) (2022)
 Flood, a 1999 album by Jocelyn Pook

Songs
 "The Flood" (Cheryl song) (2010)
 "Floods" (Fightstar song) (2008)
 "Flood" (Jars of Clay song) (1995)
 "The Flood" (Katie Melua song) (2010)
 "Floods" (Pantera song) (1996)
 "The Flood" (Take That song) (2010)
 "Flood", a song by the American band Bright from Bells Break Their Towers
 "The Flood", a song by Escape the Fate from This War Is Ours
 "Flood", a song by the Feelers from Communicate
 "The Flood", a song by the Haunted from The Dead Eye
 "The Flood", a song by Leprous from The Congregation
 "The Flood", a song by Mushroomhead from A Wonderful Life
 "Flood", a song by Neurosis from Sovereign
 "Flood I", a song by the Sisters of Mercy from Floodland
 "Flood II", a song by the Sisters of Mercy from Floodland
 "The Flood", a song by the Soundtrack of Our Lives from Behind the Music
 "Flood", a song by Tool from Undertow

Musicals
 The Flood (Stravinsky), a 1962 musical play by Igor Stravinsky
 The Flood, a 2001 musical by Peter Mills and Cara Reichel

Places
 Flood, British Columbia, Canada
 Flood, Virginia, U.S., an unincorporated community

Religion
 Flood (mythology)
 Genesis flood narrative, a flood myth found in the Tanakh

Video games
 Flood (Halo), fictional creatures in the Halo game series
 Flood (video game), a 1990 game for Amiga and Atari ST

Other uses
Flood (surname), a surname (includes a list)
Flooding (Australian football), a sports tactic
Flooding (nuclear reactor core)
Flooding (psychology), a psychotherapeutic technique
Flooding algorithm, methods for distributing material in a graph

See also
Flood v. Kuhn, a U.S. Supreme Court decision
 Flooded engine, an engine fed too much or too rich fuel
Floodlight,  an artificial light
 Fludd (disambiguation)